The Ralph and Helen Oesper Award or Oesper Award was first given in 1981 by the  University of Cincinnati and the Cincinnati Section of the American Chemical Society. The award recognizes "outstanding chemists for lifetime significant accomplishments in the field of chemistry with long-lasting impact on the chemical sciences". It was established with a bequest from Ralph E. Oesper and his wife, Helen Wilson Oesper.

Awardees 

 2021, James M. Tour, Rice University
 2020, Nicholas A. Peppas, University of Texas at Austin
 2019, R. Mark Wightman, University of North Carolina at Chapel Hill
 2018, Dave Thirumalai,  University of Texas at Austin
 2017, Matthew Platz, Ohio State University,
 2016, Maurice Brookhart, University of Houston and University of North Carolina
 2015, Karen L. Wooley, Texas A&M University
 2014, Isiah M. Warner, Louisiana State University
 2013, Richard Eisenberg, University of Rochester
 2012, Gary M. Hieftje, Indiana University
 2011, Charles P. Casey, University of Wisconsin-Madison
 2010, Kurt Wüthrich, The Scripps Research Institute, (Nobel, 2002)
 2009, Susan Lindquist, Massachusetts Institute of Technology
 2008, Alan G. Marshall, Florida State University
 2007, James P. Collman, Stanford University
 2006, Richard N. Zare, Stanford University
 2005, V. Adrian Parsegian, National Institutes of Health
 2004, George M. Whitesides, Harvard University
 2003, Alan G. MacDiarmid, University of Pennsylvania and University of Texas at Dallas (Nobel, 2000)
 2002, Royce W. Murray, University of North Carolina, Chapel Hill
 2001, Harry B. Gray, California Institute of Technology
 2000, Mildred Cohn, University of Pennsylvania
 1999, George S. Hammond, Bowling Green State University
 1998, Jerome A. Berson, Yale University
 1997, Rudolph A. Marcus, California Institute of Technology, (Nobel, 1992)
 1996, Ralph N. Adams, University of Kansas
 1995, Gregory R. Choppin, Florida State University
 1994, Klaus Biemann, Massachusetts Institute of Technology
 1993, James D. Winefordner,  University of Florida
 1992, Walter H. Stockmayer, Dartmouth College
 1991, Derek H. R. Barton, Texas A&M University (Nobel, 1969)
 1990, Herbert C. Brown, Purdue University, (Nobel, 1979)
 1989, Allen J. Bard, University of Texas at Austin 
 1988, Konrad E. Bloch, Harvard University and Florida State University (Nobel, 1964; Medicine)
 1987, George C. Pimentel, University of California, Berkeley
 1986, Henry Taube, Stanford University (Nobel, 1983)
 1985, Fred McLafferty, Cornell University
 1984, John A. Pople, Carnegie Mellon University (Nobel, 1998)
 1983, Fred Basolo, Northwestern University
 1982, John C. Sheehan, Massachusetts Institute of Technology
 1981, Melvin Calvin, University of California, Berkeley (Nobel, 1961)

See also 

 List of chemistry awards

References

Chemistry awards